The North Iowa Bulls are a Tier II junior ice hockey team in the North American Hockey League (NAHL). They play their home games at the Mason City Multipurpose Arena in Mason City, Iowa. The organization also operates a Tier III junior team in the North American 3 Hockey League (NA3HL) that was known as the North Iowa Bulls from 2011 to 2021 before relocating the Tier II Amarillo Bulls' franchise to Mason City and rebranding the Tier III team as the Mason City Toros. The Bulls are coached by Todd Sanden, who has been with the North Iowa team since its inception in 2011.

History

Tier III: 2011–present
The Bulls began playing in 2011, losing their first game to the Chicago Hitmen 3–1 before earning their first win on October 2, 2011, with a 5–4 win over the Peoria Mustangs. After losing seven of their first eight, the team finished 29–15–0–4 and second place in the West Division. The Bulls won their first round series over the Twin City Steel two-games-to-none, but lost their division final series to the Granite City Lumberjacks two-games-to-one. The teams traded overtime victories in the first two games before the Lumberjacks took the final game by a score of 3–2.

The Bulls won their first division championship the following year finishing 41–4–1–2. They swept the Minnesota Flying Aces in three games in the first round before advancing through round-robin play at the Silver Cup tournament to beat Granite City 3–2 in overtime. An 11–0 win over the Peoria Mustangs gave the team its first league championship. The Bulls then advanced to the USA Hockey Tier III Junior National Championships in Rochester, Minnesota, sweeping all three games in pool play. The Bulls defeated the Helena Bighorns in double-overtime in the semifinal and won their first Tier III Junior National Championship with a 6–2 win over the Twin Cities Northern Lights.

In the 2013–14 season, North Iowa set an NA3HL record with 90 points, finishing with a 45–3 record and their second straight West Division title. The team's top line of Matt Kroska, Rihards Marenis, and Timothy Santopoalo combined for 353 points, with Kroska's 122 points and Marenis's 55 goals setting the league records in both categories. After sweeping the Twin City Steel in the first round of the NA3HL playoffs, they once again met the Lumberjacks in the West Division finals, winning the decisive third game by a 9–5 score to advance to their second straight Silver Cup Tournament. The Bulls then outscored their opponents 24–4 over the next four games. They defeated the Flint Jr. Generals 3–0 to win their second straight Silver Cup. North Iowa advanced to the Tier III Junior National Championships in Simsbury, Connecticut, again going 3–0 in round-robin play against the Florida Jr. Blades, Dells Ducks, and Boston Bandits. The Bulls defeated the Northern Cyclones 5–1 in the semifinal game before losing 2–1 in the championship game to the Boston Junior Bruins of the USPHL Premier Division.

In 2014–15, the Bulls had a record of 6–4 through the first ten games on the road before returning home and winning 11 straight games. The Bulls and Lumberjacks led the West Division throughout the entire season, leading up to the final weekend series between the two teams to end the regular season with the Bulls winning to finish with a 37–9–1 record and the West Division title. In the playoffs, the Bulls swept the Twin City Steel in two games then defeated Granite City in three games in the division finals. In round-robin play at the Silver Cup Tournament, the Bulls defeated Granite City, the West Michigan Wolves, and the Great Falls Americans. The Bulls then lost the Silver Cup championship game to the Lumberjacks. The Bulls still advanced to the Tier III national championship as the league runners-up in Simsbury, Connecticut. The tournament was split into an "A" and "B" division with the Bulls in the "A" Division with the Granite City Lumberjacks, Dells Ducks, and Northern Cyclones. The Bulls would go 2–1 in the tournament, losing only to the Lumberjacks once again. The Bulls advanced to the title game over the Lumberjacks due to a higher score differential. The Bulls won their second Tier III national championship over the Northern Cyclones, 2–1.

North Iowa finished the 2015–16 season with a 42–2–3 record after moving to the Central Division, including a 27-game winning streak and a league-record 57 goals from captain Brett Gravelle. The Bulls defeated the Rochester Ice Hawks and La Crosse Freeze in two-game sweeps to reach the Silver Cup Tournament for the fourth straight year. The Bulls defeated the Yellowstone Quake and Great Falls Americans in the round-robin, followed by an overtime win against Twin City in the semifinal and a 4–1 victory over the Metro Jets for their third league championship in four seasons.

The Bulls earned their fifth straight trip to the Silver Cup tournament the following 2016–17 season, with another division title and a 35–10–1–1 finish in the regular season. North Iowa swept Rochester and La Crosse in two games each to advance to the Silver Cup tournament. The Bulls won two games against the Long Beach Sharks and Binghamton Jr. Senators but lost to Yellowstone in the round-robin and did not advance. North Iowa won one more Central Division title in 2017–18, going 39–4–2–2 and sweeping the Wausau RiverWolves in two games in the first round. The La Crosse Freeze then defeated the Bulls with a two-game sweep in the Central Division finals, failing to make a tournament appearance for the first time since their inaugural season.

North Iowa finished in second place in their return to the West Division in 2018–19, going 32–12–3 and finishing behind Granite City with 67 points. The Bulls defeated the Rochester Grizzlies in a three-game series. The Alexandria Blizzard beat the top-seeded Granite City in a three-game first-round series, advancing to the West Division Finals before the Bulls swept them in two games. North Iowa split its first two games at the Fraser Cup tournament, formerly known as the Silver Cup, with a loss to the Lewiston/Auburn Nordiques and a win over the Helena Bighorns, but ended their season with a 3–1 loss to the eventual champion Texas Jr. Brahmas in the semifinal.

The Bulls took the West Division title in 2019–20, going 38–7–2 for the season and winning their final eight games. The team also moved out of its longtime home at the North Iowa Ice Arena, moving downtown to the new Mason City Multipurpose Arena at midseason. The team drew record crowds in its new home, averaging 1,585 fans over its first 11 games. Prior to the start of the playoffs, the onset of the COVID-19 pandemic caused the playoffs to be cancelled.

At the time of the announcement that the North Iowa Bulls would be promoted to Tier II, it had not been decided if the organization would continue to have a Tier III team as well in 2021–22, originally deciding to only have the Tier II team in Mason City. The NA3HL Bulls won the Fraser Cup championship in their final season. The organization the stated it will still operate a Tier III team, but has not determined a brand or location. On June 1, 2021, the organization announced the Tier III team had been rebranded the Mason City Toros and would remain in Mason City for at least one more season. With Sanden staying on as head coach of the Tier II Bulls, the Toros hired Nick Bruneteau as the next head coach.

Tier II: 2021–present
In 2019, owners of the North Iowa Bulls, F&S Management Company LLC, acquired the Amarillo Bulls of the North American Hockey League (NAHL) and the North Iowa Bulls gained a Tier II affiliation. On March 5, 2021, it was announced that the Amarillo team would relocate to Mason City starting in the 2021–22 season as the North Iowa Bulls. Todd Sanden remained the head coach and general manager of the North Iowa Bulls after joining the NAHL.  They then decided on the moniker Mason City Toros.

Season-by-season records

USA Hockey Tier III Junior Hockey National Championship

Alumni
The Bulls have advanced a number of players on to higher levels of junior hockey like the North American Hockey League, as well as NCAA Division I, NCAA Division III and ACHA college programs.

Division I 
Adam Carlson (2012–13); Mercyhurst University
Aaron Davis (2012–13); Lake Superior State University
Dominik Florian (2013–14); American International College
Greg Ogard (2011–12); University of Denver
Kohei Sato (2014–16); University of New Hampshire
Jeff Solow (2015–16); Merrimack College
Josh Benson (2016–17); Sacred Heart University
Seth Eisele (2016–17); Lake Superior State University

References

External links
Bulls' website

North American Hockey League teams
Junior ice hockey teams in the United States
2011 establishments in Iowa
Ice hockey clubs established in 2011
Mason City, Iowa